NE Brasil (U-27) is a training ship of the Brazilian Navy ordered in June 1981 at Rio de Janeiro Marine Arsenal Yard, with a budget of US$124.2 million, as a modified version of the  of frigates without weapons or sensors. The ship carries 442 midshipmen (officers in training) from the Brazilian Naval and Merchant Marine Academies.

History 
The ship was one of the last to be built at the Arsenal docks in Rio de Janeiro with steel plates from CSN or Companhia Siderúrgica Nacional, during the last Military Presidency of Brazil under President João Baptista de Oliveira Figueiredo. After 1985 no military ships were built at the Arsenal and the dry docks remained empty.

Brasil regularly makes a worldwide trip every two years, starting in Rio de Janeiro and visiting ports such as Lisbon, Hamburg and London. At Hamburg it holds the record for the naval ship most often visiting the city, with 28 calls at least. In London, it usually moors alongside the HMS Belfast, passing under Tower Bridge. The round trip is during Fall in Europe, mainly at end of September and middle of October, each time with new students or cadets on board. Most of time it held an Open Ship to local visitors and even souvenirs like a coin, caps, shirt and catalogue. Since the Government of President Jair Bolsonaro, the souvenirs were cancelled, and due to the COVID-19 pandemic, the visits as well.

References

Niteroi-class frigates
Training ships of the Brazilian Navy
1983 ships
Training ships